George Atkinson was the second Surveyor General of Ceylon. He was appointed in 1805, succeeding J. Johnwil, and held the office until 1811. He was succeeded by Gualterus Schneider. 

His daughter, Maria Elisabeth, married Joseph Sansoni, the son of Louis Sansoni, the Colonial Postmaster General in 1824.

References

A